Pehria umbrina is a species of lasiocampid moth. It has a wingspan of 47mm.

Distribution
It is known from Congo-Brazzaville, (Kouilou).

References

External links

Endemic fauna of the Republic of the Congo
Lasiocampidae
Moths described in 1909
Moths of Africa